Patricia Phillips Brister, known as Pat Brister (born December 6, 1946), a businesswoman and Republican politician from Mandeville, Louisiana, who was the form president of the government in St. Tammany Parish in the New Orleans suburbs.

References

External links
 Profile at SourceWatch

1946 births
People from Mandeville, Louisiana
Louisiana Republicans
Louisiana State Republican chairmen
Women in Louisiana politics
Louisiana local politicians
Businesspeople from Louisiana
American Presbyterians
Living people
Place of birth missing (living people)
21st-century American women